Carl Nyrén (11 November 1917 – 6 November 2011) was a Swedish architect.

Biography
Nyrén was born in Jönköping, Sweden. Nyrén was the son of Johan Albert and Gertrud Nyrén and grew up in Hovslätt as the youngest of six children. He graduated from the KTH Royal Institute of Technology  in Stockholm during 1942. He was first employed by  modernist architect Paul Hedqvist. Nyrén was initially influenced by the modernism of  Gunnar Asplund (1885–1940). 
Later in the 1960s, developed towards structuralistic architecture.

During the last two decades of his career, his buildings have were characterized by a romantic, humanistic style. 

His office, Nyréns Arkitektkontor AB was founded in  1948.  The firm  employs  architects, interior designers and construction engineers. It  remains one of Sweden's leading architectural firms. 

Carl Nyrén died on November 6, 2011, five days before what would have been his 94th birthday.

Buildings 
 School of Economics at Gothenburg University, 1952
 Faculty of Education, Malmö University, 1963 and 1973
 Arrhenius Laboratory at Stockholm University, 1973
 Sparbankshuset, Stockholm, 1973-1975  
 Gottsunda Church, Uppsala, 1980
 Uppsala City Library, 1986
 Extension of the Jönköping County Museum, 1991
 "Artisten", education facility for music and theater, Gothenburg University, 1992
 Vitlycke Museum, Tanum, 1999
 Gamla Uppsala museum, Uppsala, 2000

References

External links
Nyréns Arkitektkontor website
Obituary - Nyrens Arkitektkontor
Dödsannons - SVD

Swedish architects
1917 births
2011 deaths
 People from Jönköping
KTH Royal Institute of Technology alumni
Recipients of the Prince Eugen Medal